Hopewell Township is a township in Mercer County, New Jersey, United States. Located within the Raritan Valley region, the township is an exurb of New York City in the New York metropolitan area as defined by the United States Census Bureau, while also directly bordering the Philadelphia metropolitan area, being a part of the Federal Communications Commission's Philadelphia Designated Market Area. As of the 2020 United States census, the township's population was 17,491, an increase of 187 (+1.1%) from the 2010 census count of 17,304, which in turn reflected an increase of 1,199 (+7.4%) from the 16,105 counted in the 2000 census.

The township dates back to February 20, 1700, when the area was still part of Burlington County. One of the earliest European settlers before 1710 was George Woolsey, formerly of Jamaica, Queens, whose father was one of the earliest pre-1650 settlers of what was New Amsterdam. His descendants maintained the family farm for over 200 years.

Trenton Township was formed out of this estate on June 3, 1719, later to become the City of Trenton. Hopewell Township was incorporated by Royal charter on March 1, 1755, and was re-incorporated by an act of the New Jersey Legislature on February 21, 1798, as one of the state's initial group of 104 townships. Hopewell Township became part of Mercer County at its creation on February 22, 1838. Portions of the township were taken to form Marion Township (February 22, 1838, reverted to Hopewell Township on February 14, 1839), the Borough of Pennington (January 31, 1890) and Hopewell Borough (April 14, 1891), with additional portions of the township transferred to both Pennington and Hopewell Borough in 1915.

Hopewell Township includes the location (now known as Washington Crossing) along the east side of the Delaware River to which George Washington and the Continental Army crossed from Pennsylvania. Once in Hopewell Township, the army marched to Trenton on December 26, 1776. The Battle of Trenton followed. Today, Washington Crossing State Park commemorates this important milestone in American history.

Hopewell Township was also the location where—two months after being abducted from his home in neighboring East Amwell—the body of Charles Lindbergh Jr. was discovered on May 12, 1932.

Geography
According to the United States Census Bureau, the township had a total area of 58.95 square miles (152.67 km2), including 58.07 square miles (150.40 km2) of land and 0.87 square miles (2.26 km2) of water (1.48%).

The township completely surrounds Hopewell Borough and Pennington, making it part of two of the 21 pairs of "doughnut towns" in the state, where one municipality entirely surrounds another, and the only municipality that surrounds two others. The township borders Ewing Township, Lawrence Township and Princeton in Mercer County; East Amwell Township and West Amwell Township in Hunterdon County; Montgomery Township in Somerset County; and Solebury Township and Upper Makesfield Township in Bucks County, Pennsylvania, across the Delaware River.

Ackors Corner, Baldwins Corner, Bear Tavern, Centerville, Coopers Corner, Federal City, Glenmoore, Harbourton, Harts Corner, Marshalls Corner, Moore, Mount Rose, Pleasant Valley, Stoutsburg, Titusville, Washington Crossing and Woodsville are unincorporated communities, localities and place names located within Hopewell Township. Some neighborhoods in the township include Hopewell Hunt, Brandon Farms and Elm Ridge.

Climate
According to the Köppen climate classification system, Hopewell Township has a hot-summer, wet all year, humid continental climate (Dfa). Dfa climates are characterized by at least one month having an average mean temperature ≤ 32.0 °F (≤ 0.0 °C), at least four months with an average mean temperature ≥ 50.0 °F (≥ 10.0 °C), at least one month with an average mean temperature ≥ 71.6 °F (≥ 22.0 °C), and no significant precipitation difference between seasons. During the summer months, episodes of extreme heat and humidity can occur with heat index values ≥ 100 °F (≥ 38 °C). On average, the wettest month of the year is July which corresponds with the annual peak in thunderstorm activity. During the winter months, episodes of extreme cold and wind can occur with wind chill values < 0 °F (< −18 °C). The plant hardiness zone at the Hopewell Township Municipal Court is 6b with an average annual extreme minimum air temperature of −0.4 °F (−18.0 °C).

Ecology
According to the A. W. Kuchler U.S. potential natural vegetation types, Hopewell Township, New Jersey would have an Appalachian Oak (104) vegetation type with an Eastern Hardwood Forest (25) vegetation form.

Demographics

2010 census

The Census Bureau's 2006–2010 American Community Survey showed that (in 2010 inflation-adjusted dollars) median household income was $132,813 (with a margin of error of +/− $15,634) and the median family income was $151,394 (+/− $9,062). Males had a median income of $106,431 (+/− $9,830) versus $66,285 (+/− $11,820) for females. The per capita income for the borough was $55,219 (+/− $3,466). About 0.6% of families and 1.7% of the population were below the poverty line, including 1.9% of those under age 18 and 1.3% of those age 65 or over.

2000 census
As of the 2000 United States census there were 16,105 people, 5,498 households, and 4,431 families residing in the township.  The population density was 277.1 people per square mile (107.0/km2).  There were 5,629 housing units at an average density of 96.9 per square mile (37.4/km2).  The racial makeup of the township was 77.30% White, 15.83% African American, 0.12% Native American, 3.97% Asian, 0.02% Pacific Islander, 0.66% from other races, and 1.09% from two or more races. Hispanic or Latino of any race were 2.45% of the population.

There were 5,498 households, out of which 40.6% had children under the age of 18 living with them, 71.6% were married couples living together, 6.8% had a female householder with no husband present, and 19.4% were non-families. 16.0% of all households were made up of individuals, and 6.5% had someone living alone who was 65 years of age or older.  The average household size was 2.77 and the average family size was 3.11.

In the township the population was spread out, with 26.5% under the age of 18, 5.4% from 18 to 24, 29.9% from 25 to 44, 26.8% from 45 to 64, and 11.5% who were 65 years of age or older.  The median age was 39 years. For every 100 females, there were 103.9 males.  For every 100 females age 18 and over, there were 104.3 males.

The median income for a household in the township was $93,640, and the median income for a family was $101,579. Males had a median income of $66,849 versus $47,701 for females. The per capita income for the township was $43,947.  About 0.9% of families and 1.1% of the population were below the poverty line, including 1.5% of those under age 18 and none of those age 65 or over.

Parks and recreation

 Stony Brook-Millstone Watershed Association
 Washington Crossing State Park is a state park covering  in portions of both Hunterdon County and Mercer County that commemorates "one of the pivotal events of the American Revolution."
 St. Michaels Farm Preserve, which was first preserved in 2010, is a  area of farm fields and forested land.
Woolsey Park

Government

Local government 
Hopewell Township is governed under the Township form of government, one of 141 municipalities (of the 564) statewide governed under this form. The Township Committee is comprised of five members, who are elected directly by the voters at-large in partisan elections to serve three-year terms of office on a staggered basis, with either one or two seats coming up for election each year as part of the November general election in a three-year cycle. At an annual reorganization meeting, the Township Committee selects one of its members to serve as Mayor.

, the members of the Hopewell Township Committee are Mayor Michael Ruger (D, term on committee and as mayor ends December 31, 2023), Deputy Mayor Courtney Peters-Manning (D, term on committee ends 2025,; term as deputy mayor ends 2023), David Chait (D, 2025), Kevin D. Kuchinski (D, 2023) and Urmila "Uma" Purandare (D, 2024).

In December 2022, David Chait was selected from a list of three prospective candidates nominated by the Democratic municipal committee to fill the seat expiring in December 2022 that had been held by Kristin McLaughlin until she left office to take a seat in the Mercer County Board of County Commissioners.

Citing differences with local party leadership, Mayor Harvey Lester changed his party affiliation in March 2015 from Democrat to Republican. In the November 2015 general election, Democrat Julie Blake defeated incumbent Mayor Harvey Lester, with affordable housing, development and taxes as key issues in the race.

Hopewell Township is served by the New Jersey Agricultural Experiment Station & Rutgers Cooperative Extension of Mercer County, located in Trenton.

Federal, state and county representation 
Hopewell Township is located in the 12th Congressional District and is part of New Jersey's 15th state legislative district.

Politics
As of March 2011, there were a total of 12,218 registered voters in Hopewell Township, of which 3,949 (32.3%) were registered as Democrats, 3,088 (25.3%) were registered as Republicans and 5,178 (42.4%) were registered as Unaffiliated. There were 3 voters registered as Libertarians or Greens.

{| align="center" border="2" cellpadding="4" cellspacing="0" style="float:right; margin: 1em 1em 1em 0; border: 1px #aaa solid; border-collapse: collapse; font-size: 95%;"
|+ Presidential Elections Results
|- bgcolor=lightgrey
! Year
!Republican
!Democratic
!Third Parties
|-
| style="text-align:center; |2020
| style="text-align:center; |31.6% 3,518
| style="text-align:center; |66.6%  7,419
| style="text-align:center; background:honeyDew;" |1.8% 201
|-
| style="text-align:center; |2016
| style="text-align:center; |34.3% 3,405
| style="text-align:center; |61.0%  6,049
| style="text-align:center; background:honeyDew;" |4.7% 469
|-
| style="text-align:center; |2012
| style="text-align:center; |43.8% 4,171
| style="text-align:center; |54.9%  5,223
| style="text-align:center; background:honeyDew;" |1.3% 123
|-
| style="text-align:center; |2008
| style="text-align:center; |41.4% 4,042
| style="text-align:center; |56.5%  5,517
| style="text-align:center; background:honeyDew;" |1.4% 133
|-
| style="text-align:center; |2004| style="text-align:center; |46.2% 4,476
| style="text-align:center; |51.3%'  4,974| style="text-align:center; background:honeyDew;" |0.7% 80|-
|}

In the 2012 presidential election, Democrat Barack Obama received 54.9% of the vote (5,223 cast), ahead of Republican Mitt Romney with 43.8% (4,171 votes), and other candidates with 1.3% (123 votes), among the 10,697 ballots cast by the township's 12,983 registered voters (1,180 ballots were spoiled), for a turnout of 82.4%. In the 2008 presidential election, Democrat Barack Obama received 56.5% of the vote here (5,517 cast), ahead of Republican John McCain with 41.4% (4,042 votes) and other candidates with 1.4% (133 votes), among the 9,765 ballots cast by the township's 12,615 registered voters, for a turnout of 77.4%. In the 2004 presidential election, Democrat John Kerry received 51.3% of the vote here (4,974 ballots cast), outpolling Republican George W. Bush with 46.2% (4,476 votes) and other candidates with 0.7% (80 votes), among the 9,698 ballots cast by the township's 11,780 registered voters, for a turnout percentage of 82.3.

In the 2013 gubernatorial election, Republican Chris Christie received 61.8% of the vote (3,826 cast), ahead of Democrat Barbara Buono with 36.5% (2,257 votes), and other candidates with 1.7% (107 votes), among the 6,322 ballots cast by the township's 12,818 registered voters (132 ballots were spoiled), for a turnout of 49.3%. In the 2009 gubernatorial election, Republican Chris Christie received 48.9% of the vote here (3,503 ballots cast), ahead of  Democrat Jon Corzine with 42.9% (3,074 votes), Independent Chris Daggett with 6.9% (497 votes) and other candidates with 0.5% (36 votes), among the 7,158 ballots cast by the township's 12,441 registered voters, yielding a 57.5% turnout.

Neighboring municipalities

Hopewell Township surrounds both Pennington and Hopewell Borough.

 Education 
Public school students in pre-kindergarten through twelfth grade attend the Hopewell Valley Regional School District. The comprehensive regional public school district serves students from Hopewell Borough, Hopewell Township and Pennington Borough.About Us, Hopewell Valley Regional High School. Accessed September 25, 2017. "Hopewell Valley Regional School District, as it functions today, has been a regionalized operation since 1965 when voters of Hopewell Township, Hopewell Borough and Pennington Borough approved a plan to consolidate their schools. But the first consolidation of local schools actually occurred in 1894 when the 14 separate districts, operating one-room schoolhouses throughout the valley, agreed to merge and be governed by a single school board." As of the 2019–20 school year, the district, comprised of six schools, had an enrollment of 3,467 students and 351.1 classroom teachers (on an FTE basis), for a student–teacher ratio of 9.9:1. Schools in the district (with 2019–20 enrollment data from the National Center for Education Statistics) are 
Bear Tavern Elementary School with 397 students in grades Pre-K–5, 
Hopewell Elementary School with 400 students in grades Pre-K–5, 
Stony Brook Elementary School with 378 students in grades K–5, 
Toll Gate Grammar School with 306 students in grades K–5, 
Timberlane Middle School with 820 students in grades 6–8 and 
Hopewell Valley Central High School with 1,097 students in grades 9–12.New Jersey School Directory for the Hopewell Valley Regional School District, New Jersey Department of Education. Accessed December 29, 2016. The district's Board of Education is composed of nine members, which are allocated to each of the three municipalities based on population, with Hopewell Township assigned seven seats.

Eighth grade students from all of Mercer County are eligible to apply to attend the high school programs offered by the Mercer County Technical Schools, a county-wide vocational school district that offers full-time career and technical education at its Health Sciences Academy, STEM Academy and Academy of Culinary Arts, with no tuition charged to students for attendance.High School Programs, Mercer County Technical Schools. Accessed November 18, 2019.

Transportation

Roads and highways

Several major highways pass through the township. Route 29 passes through the southwestern part of Hopewell alongside the Delaware and Raritan Canal. Route 31 is the main north–south road that goes through the township. Interstate 295 also passes through in the southern part; the highway has two interchanges in the Township: Exits 73 (Scotch Road) and 72 (Route 31). Major county roads that go through are County Route 518, County Route 546, County Route 569 and County Route 579.

Hopewell Township was supposed to be where the Somerset Freeway would have started in the south, ending in the north in either Piscataway or Franklin Township. This would have completed Interstate 95 in New Jersey. The cancellation of this project led to having the New Jersey Turnpike carry the interstate numbering instead. Originally, I-295 had extended into Hopewell Township and ended where the supposed Somerset Freeway interchange was to be built. Ultimately, the Somerset Freeway was canceled in 1982. I-295 was redesignated I-95 from the canceled interchange to the exit at U.S. Route 1 in 1993. In March 2018, I-95 through Hopewell Township became I-295 as part of the Pennsylvania Turnpike/Interstate 95 Interchange Project that completed the gap in I-95.

Public transportation
NJ Transit provides bus service between the township and Trenton on the 624.Mercer County Rider Guide, NJ Transit. Accessed November 27, 2019.

 Media Hopewell Valley NewsPennington PostTown TopicsThe Hopewell Sun''

Winery
 Hopewell Valley Vineyards

Notable people

People who were born in, residents of, or otherwise closely associated with Hopewell Township include:

 John Gano (1727–1804), Baptist minister who is said to have baptized George Washington
 Fred Green (1933–1996), former MLB relief pitcher who played most of his career with the Pittsburgh Pirates
 John Hart (–1779), signer of the United States Declaration of Independence
 Thomas Stoltz Harvey (1912–2007), pathologist who conducted the autopsy on Albert Einstein in 1955
 Rush D. Holt Jr. (born 1948), former U.S. Congressman for New Jersey's 12th congressional district, who represented the district from 1999 to 2015
 Robyn Jones (born 1985), professional soccer goalkeeper who played two years for the Philadelphia Independence of Women's Professional Soccer
 James W. Marshall (1810–1885), sawmill operator, whose 1848 find of gold in the American River in California was the impetus for the California Gold Rush
 Lyle and Erik Menendez, convicted of killing their parents in 1989
 Anne M. Patterson (born 1959), Associate Justice of the New Jersey Supreme Court
 Debbie Ryan (born 1952), former head coach of the women's basketball team at the University of Virginia, who was inducted into the Women's Basketball Hall of Fame in 2008
 Suthan Suthersan (1956–2017), environmental engineer who served as the Chief Technical Officer and Executive Vice President of Arcadis North America
 Anthony Verrelli (born 1964), carpenter, union leader and politician, who represents the 15th Legislative District in the New Jersey General Assembly
 Brandon Wagner (born 1995), professional baseball player

References

External links

Hopewell Township web site

 
1700 establishments in New Jersey
Populated places established in 1700
Township form of New Jersey government
Townships in Mercer County, New Jersey
New Jersey populated places on the Delaware River